Elme de Villiers (born 11 March 1993) is a South African female badminton player.

Career
She started playing badminton at aged 10 in Hennenman, South Africa. In 2013, she was selected among the 14 best African players to be a member of the Road to Rio Program organised by the BWF and Badminton Confederation of Africa, to provide financial and technical support to African players and the lead-up to the 2016 Olympic Games in Rio de Janeiro. She won bronze medal at the 2013 African Badminton Championships in women's doubles event with her partner Sandra Le Grange.

Achievements

African Badminton Championships
Women's Doubles

BWF International Challenge/Series (6 titles, 5 runners-up)
Women's Singles

Women's Doubles

Mixed Doubles

 BWF International Challenge tournament
 BWF International Series tournament
 BWF Future Series tournament

References

External links 
 
 
 

1993 births
Living people
People from Kroonstad
South African female badminton players
Badminton players at the 2014 Commonwealth Games
Commonwealth Games competitors for South Africa
Competitors at the 2015 African Games
African Games silver medalists for South Africa
African Games medalists in badminton
21st-century South African women